Ellsworth County (county code EW) is a county located in the U.S. state of Kansas. As of the 2020 census, the county population was 6,376. Its county seat and most populous city is Ellsworth.

History

Early history

From the 16th century to 18th century, the Kingdom of France claimed ownership of large parts of North America both east and west of the Mississippi River. In 1762, after losing the French and Indian War to Great Britain, France secretly ceded New France to Spain, per the Treaty of Fontainebleau. In 1763 France ceded its territories east of the Mississippi River to Great Britain.

It regained the western territory under Napoleon, who sold it in 1803 to the United States in the Louisiana Purchase. He had decided to get rid of the New World territories after failing to regain control of Saint-Domingue, where a slave rebellion had toppled colonial control. In 1804 Haiti declared independence as the second republic of the Western Hemisphere.

The Plains Indians retained control of much of their territory until the late 19th century, giving way finally before superior United States arms and technology. Their territories were invaded by settlers, and crossed by the development of improved routes for settlers' emigrant wagon trains to the West Coast, followed by more permanent construction of transcontinental railroads. These brought tens of thousands of settlers to the Plains.

19th century
In 1802, Spain returned most of the land to France, but keeping title to about 7,500 square miles.  In 1803, most of the land for modern day Kansas was acquired by the United States from France as part of the 828,000 square mile Louisiana Purchase for 2.83 cents per acre.

In 1854, the Kansas Territory was organized; and in 1861 Kansas became the 34th U.S. state.  Ellsworth County was established February 26, 1867.  The county was named after the old Fort Ellsworth, named in honor of 2nd Lieutenant Allen Ellsworth of the 7th Iowa Cavalry (Company H), who supervised construction of the fort in 1864 during the American Civil War. On November 17, 1866, the fort was renamed Fort Harker in honor of General Charles Garrison Harker who had died on June 27, 1864, from wounds received in an abortive offensive action in the Battle of Kennesaw Mountain.  The fort was subsequently moved to a new site about one mile to the northeast, and the old fort's remaining buildings were ordered torn down in June 1867.

On March 22, 1869, Fourteen Pawnee Indians, including scouts who had been honorably discharged after working for the army, were traveling through Ellsworth County when they ran into U.S. cavalry troops. Though the Pawnees had discharge papers from the army, a fight ensued. The Indians retreated to a sandstone cave, known today as Palmer's Cave. Their attackers set fire to grass at the cave's entrance, and six to nine Pawnees were killed as they ran out. The others died from exposure without their possessions. A few days later, the post surgeon at nearby Fort Harker, in today's town of Kanopolis, removed six heads from their bodies, and shipped them to the Army Medical Museum in Washington, D.C., for cranial study.

In the later 19th century, this area became known for cattle ranching and cattle drives. Town life was often riotous with cowboys celebrating after long drives.

Geography
It is intersected by the Smoky Hill River.

Adjacent counties
 Lincoln County (north)
 Saline County (east)
 McPherson County (southeast)
 Rice County (south)
 Barton County (southwest)
 Russell County (northwest)

Demographics

As of the 2000 census, there were 6,525 people, 2,481 households, and 1,639 families residing in the county.  The population density was 9 people per square mile (4/km2).  There were 3,228 housing units at an average density of 4 per square mile (2/km2).  The racial makeup of the county was 93.67% White, 3.56% Black or African American, 0.48% Native American, 0.25% Asian, 0.02% Pacific Islander, 0.86% from other races, and 1.18% from two or more races. Hispanic or Latino of any race were 3.59% of the population.

There were 2,481 households, out of which 27.90% had children under the age of 18 living with them, 57.20% were married couples living together, 6.20% had a female householder with no husband present, and 33.90% were non-families. 31.40% of all households were made up of individuals, and 17.30% had someone living alone who was 65 years of age or older.  The average household size was 2.30 and the average family size was 2.88.

In the county, the population was spread out, with 21.40% under the age of 18, 7.30% from 18 to 24, 27.10% from 25 to 44, 23.80% from 45 to 64, and 20.40% who were 65 years of age or older.  The median age was 42 years. For every 100 females there were 111.90 males.  For every 100 females age 18 and over, there were 114.10 males.

The median income for a household in the county was $35,772, and the median income for a family was $44,360. Males had a median income of $30,110 versus $20,486 for females. The per capita income for the county was $16,569.  About 4.00% of families and 7.20% of the population were below the poverty line, including 7.50% of those under age 18 and 11.10% of those age 65 or over.

Government

Presidential elections

Laws
Ellsworth County was a prohibition, or "dry", county until the Kansas Constitution was amended in 1986. Voters approved the sale of alcoholic liquor by the individual drink, with a 30% food sales requirement.

Education

Unified school districts
 Central Plains USD 112
 Ellsworth USD 327

Communities

Cities
 Ellsworth
 Wilson
 Kanopolis
 Holyrood
 Lorraine

Unincorporated communities
 Black Wolf
 Carneiro
 Delight
 Elkhorn
 Langley
 Venango
 Yankee Run

Ghost towns
 Arcola
 Terra Cotta
 Frantz
 Midway

Townships
Ellsworth County is divided into nineteen townships.  The city of Ellsworth is considered governmentally independent and is excluded from the census figures for the townships.  In the following table, the population center is the largest city (or cities) included in that township's population total, if it is of a significant size.

See also
 Faris Caves
 Kanopolis Drive-in Theatre
 Kanopolis State Park and Kanopolis Lake
 Mushroom Rock State Park
 National Register of Historic Places listings in Ellsworth County, Kansas

References

Notes

Further reading

 Standard Atlas of Ellsworth County, Kansas; Geo. A. Ogle & Co; 70 pages; 1918.
 Plat Book of Ellsworth County, Kansas; North West Publishing Co; 41 pages; 1901.

External links

County
 
 Ellsworth County - Directory of Public Officials
Other
 Ellsworth County Independent Reporter (local newspaper)
 Kansas Post Offices, 1828-1961 (Ellsworth County)
Maps
 Ellsworth County Maps: Current, Historic, KDOT
 Kansas Highway Maps: Current, Historic, KDOT
 Kansas Railroad Maps: Current, 1996, 1915, KDOT and Kansas Historical Society

 
Kansas counties
1867 establishments in Kansas
Populated places established in 1867